Bachi are wooden sticks used for Japanese percussion instruments.

Bachi may also refer to: 

 Bächi, a village in Switzerland
 Bachi (film), a 2000 Indian Telugu-language film
 A French Navy sailor cap
 A nickname for the USS Suribachi (AE-21)